Joseph Henry Butler (1879 – August 1941) was an English professional football goalkeeper who made 457 appearances in the Football League for Stockport County, Clapton Orient, Glossop, Sunderland and Lincoln City. With Sunderland, he won the 1912–13 First Division title and played on the losing side in the 1913 FA Cup Final.

Honours 
Sunderland
 Football League First Division (1): 1912–13
 Newcastle & Sunderland Hospitals Cup (2): 1912–13, 1913–14

Career statistics

References

1879 births
1941 deaths
People from Telford
English footballers
Association football goalkeepers
Stockport County F.C. players
Leyton Orient F.C. players
Glossop North End A.F.C. players
Sunderland A.F.C. players
Lincoln City F.C. players
Macclesfield Town F.C. players
English Football League players
Date of birth missing
Place of death missing
FA Cup Final players